The Gruppenliga is the seventh tier of football in the German state of Hesse. The Gruppenligas were established in 2008, replacing the Bezirksoberligas in the state. Below the Gruppenligas sit the Kreisoberligas in Hesse.

Gruppenligas
The Gruppenligas:

References

External links
Das deutsche Fussball Archiv 

7